Alexander Theobald Van Laer (1857–1920) was an American painter, born at Auburn, New York.

He studied at the Art Students League of New York and in the Netherlands under George Poggenbeek. He often exhibited with Adelaide Deming and Emily Vanderpoel.

Examples of his landscapes include: 
 February Snow (Brooklyn Museum)
 Connecticut Hillside (National Gallery, Washington, D.C.)
 On the Brandywine (Herron Art Institute, Indianapolis).

External links
 Biographical Notes, a collection of biographical information and images of 50 American artists, containing information about the artist on page 48.

References

1857 births
1920 deaths
19th-century American painters
American male painters
20th-century American painters
20th-century American male artists
Art Students League of New York alumni
American people of Dutch descent
Artists from Auburn, New York
Painters from New York City
Members of the Salmagundi Club
19th-century American male artists